This is a list of massacres that have taken place in the Philippines.

Pre-Independence (1521-1946)

Post-Independence (1946-1972)

Martial Law (September 21, 1972-January 17, 1981)

Post-Martial Law (1986-present)

References

Philippines
Massacres
Massacres in the Philippines
Massacres